The Transportpolizei (German for "Transport Police") was the transit police of the German Democratic Republic (East Germany), whose officers were commonly nicknamed TraPos. It was part of the Volkspolizei and dealt with all modes of transit but primarily with trains and railroads. It consisted of approximately 8,500 men, that were organized from a national level and at district level with each Deutsche Reichsbahn district; Berlin, Cottbus, Dresden, Erfurt, Greifswald, Halle, Magdeburg and Schwerin. They wore dark-blue uniforms (that were colloquially called “blueberries”) instead of the standard green Volkspolizei uniform.  They were organized into sixteen companies and equipped with small arms and RPG-7 shoulder-fired antitank grenade launchers. The Transportpolizei supervised all larger train stations and controlled the travellers, particularly at the border with West Germany, and directed traffic. Before the building of the Berlin Wall, the Transportpolizei controlled the S-Bahn in West Berlin (as the Deutsche Reichsbahn controlled the S-Bahn in both East and West Berlin). In the 'interzone courses' (later called 'transit courses') there was always an escort party of the Transportpolizei present. The service training school of the Transportpolizei was in Halle.

From January 1953 until February 1957 the Transportpolizei was part of the Ministry for State Security, in turn part of the Office of the Secretary of State. Starting from March 1957 it was transferred to the Volkspolizei, whose supervising inspector was Otto Auerswald.

After German reunification in 1990 the Transportpolizei was dissolved, with some 1200 of its personnel transferring to the (West) German Bahnpolizei. On April 1, 1992 the Bahnpolizei was taken over by the German Federal Border Guard (now called the German Federal Police).

See also
 Eastern Bloc politics

Notes

 Wolfgang Mittmann (1998); Die Transportpolizei (1945–1990), Berlín: Links, Forschungen zur DDR-Gesellschaft.

External links
 Transportpolizei Lexicon
 Die Transportpolizei (“Trapo“)

Defunct law enforcement agencies of East Germany
Law enforcement in East Germany
Paramilitary organisations based in Germany
Transit police departments
1992 disestablishments in Germany